Barnabas Fung Wah, GBS (born 1960) is a Hong Kong judge. He has served as a High Court Judge since 2006.

Since 2016, Fung has served as a Panel Judge handling interception and surveillance authorisation requests from law enforcement agencies.

He was Chairman of the Electoral Affairs Commission from 2009 to 2022.

He previously served as Chairman and Director of the Hong Kong Children's Choir.

Education and legal career
Fung was educated at Wah Yan College, Hong Kong and Barker College, Australia. He graduated from the University of New South Wales with a BComm and LLB in 1984 and 1985 respectively. He obtained his PCLL from the University of Hong Kong in 1986.

Fung was called to the New South Wales Bar and Hong Kong Bar in 1985 and 1986 respectively. He was a barrister in private practice in Hong Kong from 1987 to 1993.

Judicial career
In 1993, Fung joined the bench as a Permanent Magistrate. He became a District Judge in 1998 and was subsequently appointed as Chief District Judge in 2001.

Fung sat as a Deputy High Court Judge intermittently from December 2001 to July 2006.

In November 2006, Fung was appointed as a Judge of the Court of First Instance of the High Court. He was the Judge in charge of the Personal Injury List from 2008 to 2010.

Fung acted as Returning Officer for the 2007 Hong Kong Chief Executive election.

In 2009, Fung was appointed as Chairman of the Electoral Affairs Commission. He was re-appointed in 2013 and 2017 (for a term of 5 years until 2022). On 16 August 2022, it was announced that Fung's chairmanship of the EAC expired that day and the Government was actively identifying his successor, whose appointment would be announced in due course.

Fung has sat in the Court of Appeal in a number of civil and criminal appeal cases.

Awards 
 2017 Gold Bauhinia Star (in recognition of his distinguished service as the Chairman of the Electoral Affairs Commission)

References

Living people
1960 births
University of New South Wales alumni
University of New South Wales Law School alumni
Alumni of the University of Hong Kong
Barristers of Hong Kong
Hong Kong judges